P680, or photosystem II primary donor, is the reaction-center chlorophyll a molecular dimer associated with photosystem II in plants, algae, and cyanobacteria, and central to oxygenic photosynthesis.

Etymology 
Its name is derived from the word “pigment” (P) and the presence of a major bleaching band centered around 680-685 nm in the flash-induced absorbance difference spectra of P680/ P680+•.

Components 
The structure of P680 consists of a heterodimer of two distinct chlorophyll molecules, 
referred to as P and P. This “special pair” forms an excitonic dimer that functions as a single unit, excited by light energy as if they were a single molecule.

Action and function

Excitation 
P680 receives excitation energy either by directly absorbing a photon of suitable frequency or indirectly from other chlorophylls within photosystem II, thereby exciting an electron to a higher energy level. The resulting P680 with a loosened electron is designated as P680*, which is a strong reducing agent.

Charge separation 
Following excitation, the loosened electron of P680* is taken up by the primary electron acceptor, a pheophytin molecule located within photosystem II near P680. During this transfer, P680* is ionized and oxidized, producing cationic P680.

Recovery of P680 
P680+ is the strongest biological oxidizing agent known, with an estimated redox potential of ~1.3 V. This makes it possible to oxidize water during oxygenic photosynthesis. P680+ recovers its lost electron by oxidizing water via the oxygen-evolving complex, which regenerates P680.

See also 
 P700
 Photosystem I
 Photosystem II

References

Bibliography 

 
 

Photosynthesis
Light reactions